Chase County High School may refer to:

 Chase County High School (Nebraska) in Imperial, Nebraska
 Chase County Junior/Senior High School in Cottonwood Falls, Kansas